Eric Dupont is a French producer for Incognito films, best known for producing the short-film Ave Maria, which earned him a nomination for the Academy Award for Best Live Action Short Film at the 88th Academy Awards.

Filmography

 Ave Maria 
 The Old Man Who Read Love Stories

References

External links
 
 

Living people
French film producers
Date of birth missing (living people)
Year of birth missing (living people)